The Chinese University of Hong Kong (CUHK) is a public research university in Ma Liu Shui, Hong Kong, formally established in 1963 by a charter granted by the Legislative Council of Hong Kong. It is the territory's second-oldest university and was founded as a federation of three existing colleges – Chung Chi College, New Asia College and United College – the oldest of which was founded in 1949.

CUHK is organized into nine constituent colleges and eight academic faculties, and remains the only collegiate university in the territory. The university operates in both English and Chinese, although classes in most colleges are taught in English. Four Nobel laureates are associated with the university, and it is the only tertiary institution in Hong Kong with recipients of the Nobel Prize, Turing Award, Fields Medal and Veblen Prize sitting as faculty in residence.

History

Origins
The university was formed in 1963 as a federation of three existing colleges. The first of these, New Asia College, was established in 1949 by anti-Communist Confucian scholars from Mainland China amid the revolution there. Among the founders were Ch'ien Mu, Tang Junyi, and Tchang Pi-kai. Curriculum focused particularly on Chinese heritage and social concerns. The early years of this school were tumultuous, with the campus relocating several times between rented premises around Kowloon. Academics there were often self-exiled from the mainland and they struggled financially, with students sometimes sleeping on rooftops and teachers foregoing pay to sustain the college. Funds were gradually raised and the school moved to a new campus in Kau Pui Lung, built with the support of the Ford Foundation, in 1956.

Following the Communist revolution and the breakdown in relations between China and the United States at the 1950 outbreak of the Korean War, all Christian colleges and universities in the People's Republic of China were shut down. Chung Chi College was founded in 1951 by Protestant churches in Hong Kong to continue the theological education of mainland churches and schools. The 63 students of its first year operating were taught in various church and rented premises on Hong Kong Island. The college moved to its present location in Ma Liu Shui (i.e., the present CUHK campus) in 1956. By 1962, a year before the founding of CUHK, Chung Chi had 531 students in 10 departments taught by a full-time faculty of 40, excluding tutors.

United College was founded in 1956 with the merging of five private colleges in Guangdong province: Canton Overseas, Kwang Hsia, Wah Kiu, Wen Hua, and Ping Jing College of Accountancy. The first school president was Dr F.I. Tseung. The original campus on Caine Road on Hong Kong Island accommodated over 600 students.

These three colleges (along with some others created during this era) helped fill a void in the post-secondary education options available to Hong Kong Chinese students. Before 1949, such students could attend a university in the mainland. But with this option spoiled by the upheavals in China, students were unable to further their studies at a university unless their English proficiency was sufficient to enrol at the University of Hong Kong, then the only university in the territory. In 1957, New Asia College, Chung Chi College, and United College came together to establish the Chinese Colleges Joint Council.

Foundation

In June 1959, the Hong Kong government expressed its intent to establish a new university with a medium of instruction of Chinese. The same year, the Post-Secondary Colleges Ordinance was announced to provide government funding and official recognition to New Asia, Chung Chi and United colleges in hopes that the money would "enable them to raise their standards to a level at which they might qualify for university status, probably on a federal basis". The ordinance was enacted on 19 May 1960.

The Chinese University Preparatory Committee was established in June 1961 to advise the government on possible sites for the new university. The following May, the Fulton Commission was formed to assess the suitability of the three government-funded Post-Secondary Colleges to become constituent colleges of the new university. The commission, headed by Vice-Chancellor John Fulton of the newly established University of Sussex, visited Hong Kong over the summer and produced an interim report recommending the establishment of the federal university comprising the three colleges.

The Fulton Commission report was tabled in the Legislative Council in June 1963, and the Chinese University of Hong Kong Ordinance was passed in September of that year. The school was officially inaugurated in a ceremony at City Hall on 17 October 1963, officiated by the founding chancellor, Sir Robert Brown Black. The next year, Dr. Li Choh-ming was appointed the first vice-chancellor of the university. The university originally comprised the Faculty of Arts, Faculty of Science and Faculty of Social Science. Construction began at the site of the new campus in the Ma Liu Shui area, where Chung Chi College was already established, for new facilities to house central administration and the relocated New Asia and United colleges.

1963–present

Construction of the new campus continued throughout the 1960s to a development plan produced by W. Szeto and Partners. Above the valley occupied by Chung Chi College, on two plateaux formed by granite quarrying for the Plover Cove dam, the quarters for the other two colleges would flank the Central Campus housing administrative buildings and other shared facilities. Some of the most iconic buildings on campus, like the University Library, were built in this period along the monumental axis of the University Mall in the subdued concrete aesthetic for which the school is known. The School of Education, which would later become a faculty, was founded in 1965. The Graduate School, the first in Hong Kong, was founded in 1966 and the first batch of master's degrees were awarded the following year.

In the early 1970s, New Asia and United College moved into their new premises on the highest plateau of the campus. The Student Union was established in 1971. The School of Medicine was founded in 1977 and the teaching hospital, the Prince of Wales Hospital in nearby Sha Tin New Town, was established several years later.

The university constitution was also reviewed in the 1970s with an aim to assess the school's growth and chart its future. In 1975 the chancellor appointed an external commission, again chaired by Lord Fulton, to review the university constitution. Aside from Fulton, the commission comprised I.C.M. Maxwell (its secretary), Sir Michael Herries, and Professor C.K. Yang. The commission held five days of filmed hearings to garner comments from stakeholders. This second Fulton Report recommended that academic policy, finances, matriculation of students, appointment of staff, curriculum, examinations, and the awarding of degrees fall under the purview of the university administration. Buildings would also be maintained by the university regardless of which college owned them. The colleges would be entrusted with small group "student-oriented teaching". Rationalisation was suggested to reduce duplication of efforts among the different colleges. 

The federal structure of the university would thus be replaced by something closer to that of a unitary university. This was controversial among the colleges. The Board of Governors of New Asia College flatly rejected the recommendations of the report, alleging that it would destroy the collegiate system, turning the colleges into "empty shells". Dr. Denny Huang, a longtime member of the Board of Governors of Chung Chi College, criticised the effort to centralise powers and stated that the college governorship would be reduced to "nothing more than managers of an estate". The Fulton Report recommendations were packaged into the Chinese University of Hong Kong Bill 1976. In defence of the bill the acting Secretary for Social Services, M.C. Morgan, said that "a situation with each college developing into a little university of its own was not compatible with the sensible evolution of a modern major seat of higher learning". The changes recommended by the report came into effect in December 1976.

The first non-founding college, Shaw College, was named after its patron, Sir Run Run Shaw, who donated five hundred million Hong Kong dollars toward its establishment in May 1985. The Chinese University of Hong Kong (Declaration of Shaw College) Ordinance was passed by the Legislative Council in July 1986, and the fourth college was officially opened in March 1990 by Run Run Shaw and Governor David Wilson.

The 1990s brought about another building boom. The original Chung Chi teaching and administration blocks were demolished and replaced with larger, more modern structures in several phases over the course of a decade. The Ho Sin-Hang engineering block opened in 1994 to house the new School of Engineering. In 1994, the school transitioned to a British-style three-year bachelor's degree system. The Hong Kong Internet Exchange, a metropolitan network backbone, was founded in 1995 and remains an internet hub for the region.

In the 2000s, the underwent another period of expansion, in part to accommodate increased student numbers brought about by the 334 Scheme. Five new colleges came into operation: Morningside College (Hong Kong) and S. H. Ho College were announced in 2006, and were followed in 2007 by C. W. Chu College, Wu Yee Sun College and Lee Woo Sing College. These colleges are smaller in scale than the older ones, each comprising only one or two blocks rather than an entire section of campus and housing fewer students, but they nonetheless each contain the usual array of facilities like student hostels, amenities and communal dining halls. New teaching blocks and a student amenity centre were also opened near the railway station.

Goddess of Democracy

On 29 May 2010, when the CUHK student union sought to permanently locate a 'Goddess of Democracy' statue on campus, the administrative and planning committee of the university convened an emergency meeting for 1 June, chaired by incumbent vice-chancellor Lawrence Lau, to consider the request. The application was turned down; the reason provided was the need for the university to maintain political neutrality. Staff and students objected to the refusal, however, accusing the committee of self-censorship; students declared they were prepared for a stand-off against the university, saying they would ensure the statues were accommodated on campus "at all costs".

A student meeting was convened, and student union President Eric Lai told 2,000 attendees that the university officials should apologise for their opposition of the art display. On 4 June, bowing to public outcry and student pressure, the university relented, and allowed the statue on campus.

Vice-chancellor-designate Joseph Sung, who was consulted on the vote in absentia, admitted that it was the biggest political storm in 21 years. He revealed that, in addition to preserving political neutrality, safety and security concerns were factors in the decision. He also drew a distinction between this application – for a permanent University installation – and hypothetical applications for short-term expressions of free speech, suggesting the latter would have been more likely to be approved, but he criticised the management team as "immature" and "inexperienced" in handling the incident.

An editorial in The Standard criticised the committee's naivety in not anticipating the reaction. It was also highly critical of Sung for seeking to distance himself from the decision with such a "lame excuse". Outgoing vice-chancellor Lawrence Lau defended the committee's decision as "collective and unanimous" after "detailed consideration," citing the unanimous vote of the administrative and planning committee, and he disagreed with Sung's characterisation of the management team. While the vote was unanimous, however, Sung stated that he had suggested the wording of the decision include the qualification that the committee "had not reached a consensus."

The student union said the two professors should have communicated to reach a consensus, and that Lau's reply "failed to explain why the school used political neutrality as a reason to reject the statue."

2019 protest conflict

During the 2019–20 Hong Kong protests, the campus became the site of a series of clashes between protesters and the Hong Kong Police Force. Students and protesters disrupted traffic near the university to facilitate a Hong Kong-wide general strike on 11 November 2019. On 12 November, the riot police entered the campus and fired 1,567 tear gas rounds, 380 bean bag rounds and 1,312 rubber bullets while protesters built barricades, throwing bricks and petrol bombs. President Rocky Tuan tried to seek mediation with the police, which was rejected. It resulted in a two-day siege of the university by the police from 13 to 15 November. Most protesters left the campus by 15 November. At least 70 students were injured. Protestors barricaded most entrances and exits, leading to a campus-wide transport disruption. The increasing violence led to the University Senate voting to cancel the ongoing semester, followed by a university-wide evacuation.

Administration and organisation

Governance
Prior to Hong Kong's handover, the colony's governor was the de jure chancellor of the university. That role was assumed by the territory's chief executive following the handover. For a list of pre- and post-handover university chancellors, refer to the articles for the governor of Hong Kong and the chief executive of Hong Kong.

Administration

President and vice-chancellor 
The president/vice-chancellor is under the council of the university, followed by the pro-vice-chancellor/vice-president. There are nine colleges and eight faculties, each of which has its own dean/head.

List of presidents and vice-chancellors since 1963

 Li Choh-ming (1963–78)
 Ma Lin (1978–87)
 Sir Charles Kao (1987–96)
 Arthur Li (1996–2002)
 Ambrose King (2002–30 June 2004)
 Lawrence Lau (1 July 2004 – 30 June 2010)
 Joseph Sung (1 July 2010 – 31 December 2017)
 Rocky Tuan (1 January 2018 – present)

Organisation 
CUHK is a comprehensive research university with most departments and schools organised into eight faculties, namely the Faculties of Arts, Business Administration, Education, Engineering, Law, Medicine, Science, and Social Science, along with a graduate school which administrates all the postgraduate programmes provided by different academic units. Moreover, associate School of Continuing and Professional Studies (CUSCS) offers associate degree and higher diploma programmes.

Funding
In 2005, the university budget was HK$4,558 million, with government subvention of about HK$2,830 million. In the 2018–19 fiscal year (starts 1 April), total income was increased to $9,624 million while government subvention had risen to $5,121 million, about 53.2% of the total budget.

Academics

Teaching and learning
CUHK currently adopts a strategic plan in five fields of academic inquiry: Biomedical Sciences, Chinese Studies, Economics & Finance, Geoinformation & Earth Sciences and Information Sciences. Despite the stipulation of using Chinese language as the principal medium in the university's ordinance, CUHK has emphasised the importance of both English and Chinese. However, most classes still adopt English as the main language of instruction.

Research

The Yale-China Chinese Language Centre (CLC), formerly New Asia – Yale-in-China Chinese Language Center, was founded in 1963 under the joint auspices of New Asia College and the Yale-China Association. The centre became part of Chinese University in 1974 and has been responsible for the teaching of one language education (Putonghua and Cantonese) of university students as well as other Putonghua and Cantonese learners. Courses are offered for non-native speakers and for native speakers of Chinese. Programmes are divided into Putonghua courses for local students, Cantonese courses for mainland Chinese Students and Putonghua and Cantonese courses for non-native Chinese speakers.

The university also hosts several research centres. The Childhood Bilingualism Research Centre (CBRC) is part of the Department of Linguistics and Modern Languages. Research at the centre includes documenting the development of bilingualism in bilingual children and assessing the bilingual competence they gain in childhood; raising the public's awareness of Hong Kong children's development of biliteracy and trilingualism; and studying and supporting the revitalisation of minority languages in the context of bilingual and multilingual education. The centre is directed by Professor Virginia Yip and Professor Stephen Matthews.

The Universities Service Centre for China Studies (USC), founded in 1963 as "The Universities Service Center," was renamed and moved from Kowloon to the campus in 1988.
Its mission is to support the study of contemporary China and Hong Kong, especially among mainland Chinese, Hong Kong, and international scholars. The centre houses a major collection of mainland newspapers, periodicals, and official publications.

Libraries and museums

The University Library System (ULS) comprises seven different libraries and several special collections. The largest library is the University Library at the Central Campus, which recently underwent a significant renovation and building expansion. The other six libraries are the Elisabeth Luce Moore Library, Ch’ien Mu Library, Wu Chung Library, Architecture Library, Li Ping Medical Library, and Lee Quo Wei Law Library.

Among the collections housed by ULS includes the Hong Kong Studies Archive, Hong Kong Literature Collection, Chinese Overseas Collection, Nobel Laureate GAO, Xingjian Collection, Nobel Laureate CY Yang Archive, American Studies Resource Collection and Modern Chinese Drama Collection.

CUHK also houses the Chinese University of Hong Kong Art Museum, which houses "a wide range of artefacts illuminating the rich arts, humanities and cultural heritage of ancient and pre-modern China."

A new  Museum of Climate Change, the first such museum in Hong Kong, opened in December 2013 in the Yasumoto International Academic Park building. Funded by the Hong Kong Jockey Club, the 100 exhibits on display illustrate the effects of climate change. The museum is open to the public free of charge. Also in 2013, the University Gallery opened in the central library to showcase the history of the school in light of its Golden Jubilee anniversary.

Reputation and rankings

CUHK has been consistently regarded as a member of the top three higher learning institutions in the territory by various university rankings. In particular, it has continuously been the top Hong Kong institution in the ARWU, which is based on awards and research output, including those league tables in 2006, 2010, 2011, and 2013. HKU Public Opinion Programme survey (2012) gave it the 2nd place. Besides overall rankings, a list of subject rankings of Hong Kong tertiary institutions is available to show the strength of its individual disciplines ranked by the above organisations. The university came 95th in the world by US News & Report. China's Alumni Association placed it among the "6-Star Greater China's Universities" (the highest level) and it was ranked fourth in the Association's 2014 Ranking of Institutions with the Most Best Disciplines in HK, Macau and Taiwan. CUHK received eight Higher Education Outstanding Scientific Research Output Awards (Science and Technology) from the Ministry of Education (MoE) in 2014, including two first-class awards and five second-class awards in Natural Sciences, making it the institution receiving the highest number of awards in the local tertiary sector. CUHK was ranked as world's #49 in 2019 in QS ranking.

CUHK business school was ranked 17th in the Financial Times EMBA rankings, and its MBA programme was placed 27th worldwide in the Global MBA Rankings (2013) and 94th in the Economist's 2012 ranking.

Despite a short history of 36 years as of 2017, CUHK's medical school was ranked as world's #49 in 2014 and #47 in 2016 in QS ranking. It has built abundant specialty research centres and hailed constant research innovations by its faculty. The medical school curriculum also places a heavy emphasis on bioethics and humanity in medicine and has built this course track in collaboration with Columbia University. CUHK is expecting its first and only private hospital to finish construction in 2021. The hospital's philanthropic mission is to provide affordable and quality health care to serve local Hong Kong citizens and it will help admit and treat public hospital patients to ease the burden of overflow beginning in its 5th year of operation.

Student life

School environment

CUHK possesses the largest campus of all higher education institutions in Hong Kong. The hilly  campus hosts a range of facilities essential for an all-round campus experience, such as libraries, art museums, music halls, a swimming pool, sports fields, tennis courts, squash courts, a water sports centre and gymnasiums. Many points (e.g., Pavilion of Harmony) around the campus offer attractive views of Tide Cove and the Tolo Harbour.

The university has two full-size sports grounds with running tracks: the Sir Philip Haddon-Cave Sports Field and the Lingnan Stadium. The Olympic-size swimming pool at the Benjamin Franklin Centre was completed in 1973, with an opening ceremony held in October 1974 hosted by Charles T. Cross. The university Water Sports Centre, on the shore of Tide Cove, offers facilities and equipment hire for sailing, rowing, and windsurfing.

Most of CUHK is in Sha Tin District although small parts are in Tai Po District.

Collegiate system

As a collegiate university, the school comprises nine colleges that differ in character and history, each retaining substantial autonomy on institutional affairs: Chung Chi College, New Asia College, United College, Shaw College, Morningside College, S. H. Ho College, Lee Woo Sing College, Wu Yee Sun College and C. W. Chu College. All undergraduates are affiliated to one of them.

Colleges are designed as communities with their own hostels, dining halls and other facilities. Students receive pastoral care and whole-person education, including formal and non-formal general education by means of close interaction with teachers and peers, and in some colleges, assemblies and college final year project. Colleges promote extracurricular social and athletic activities with an aim of building camaraderie among students. This focus on 'student orientated teaching', education through both formal teaching and student empowerment, distinguishes CUHK from other universities in the territory.

When the structure of the university was revamped in 1976, and the autonomy of the colleges diminished, Lord Fulton clarified the role of the colleges: "the natural home of student-oriented teaching is the college [which] is an association of senior and junior members come together in pursuit of shared academic interests and aims." He wrote that the colleges help students achieve "a sense of his or her personal significance and responsibility, and on that basis to enrich the common life."

Transportation

Although the campus is located away from the busier districts of Hong Kong, access to the school is easy. The university is served by University station of the Mass Transit Railway (MTR) as well as the Hong Kong bus system. Bus and railway stations are located beside Chung Chi College, with additional bus stops just outside the two school entrances on Tai Po Road. To cope with new students from the 3-3-4 education system, the new exit D of University station opened in September 2012.

A system of shuttle bus routes, operated by the university's Transport Office, runs between the MTR station, academic buildings, and residences. Shuttle buses are free for students and staff. There are paid shuttle light bus operating from Monday to Saturday as well. The topography of the campus, as well a layout confusing to newcomers, may deter many from walking around campus. Many buildings on campus incorporate lifts and bridges designed to provide shortcuts in ascending the hill. The latest campus master plan has recognized this strategy as desirable and proposes the development of new walking routes to reduce reliance on the campus bus system.

Notable people

As of 2013, four Nobel Prize winners are associated with the university, including Chen Ning Yang, James Mirrlees, Robert Alexander Mundell and former university president Charles K. Kao.

Other notable faculty members include mathematician Shing-Tung Yau, laureate of the Fields Medal and the Veblen Prize, and computational theorist Andrew Yao, laureate of the Turing Award, and surgeon James Ware.

See also

 Education in Hong Kong
 Joint University Programmes Admissions System
 List of buildings and structures in Hong Kong
 List of universities in Hong Kong
 Orientation camps in Hong Kong
 Renditions
 The Chinese University of Hong Kong Chorus
 The Chinese University of Hong Kong, Shenzhen
 The Chinese University Press
 CUHK democracy wall standoff

Notes

References

External links

 

 
1963 establishments in Hong Kong
Educational institutions established in 1963
Ma Liu Shui
Nursing schools in Hong Kong